Engage!: The Complete Guide for Brands and Businesses to Build, Cultivate, and Measure Success in the New Web is a bestselling book by speaker, digital analyst, and author Brian Solis. In Engage!, Solis provides an in-depth analysis of social media as a tool used in businesses. He focuses on how to leverage it to be successful in the world of business. In other words, Solis brings forth the tips that people can use to best market their products or services. Actor Ashton Kutcher wrote the foreword.

Synopsis
The first half of Engage! introduces social media entities such as Facebook, YouTube, and Twitter, with chapters labeled "The New Media University: Social Media" 101, 201, 202, etc., all the way until "MBA Program—Second Year." Solis uses this university metaphor to help anyone at any place in their career start where they need to and go back and study the basics as necessary.

The second half of Engage! explores how to start social media programs, how to sell the program once started, and how to measure return on investment (ROI). Solis also explores the murky separation of personal and professional interactions in social media. He argues that social media channels are being used to broadcast in a one-to-many format not unlike traditional format before it. He believes that the formula for social media is instead one-to-one-to many, which will yield many to many.

Worksheets to assist planning and brand management are included.

In all, Engage! is separated into six parts:

 Part I: The New Reality of Marketing and Customer Service 
 Part II: Forever Students of New Media
 Part III: Brand Representative Versus The Brand of You 
 Part IV: We Are the Champions 
 Part V: The Social Architect: Developing a Blueprint for New Marketing 
 Part VI: A Little Less Conversation, A Little More Action: Rising Above the Noise

Reception
Apple Fellow Guy Kawasaki, Craigslist founder Craig Newmark, and author Andrew Keen blurbed the book. Newmark said, "Engage! gets you up to date regarding current trends and technology, and shows you how to build a serious social media strategy."

Engage! was a Top 10 Business Bestseller at Business Standard and an 800CEORead Business Book Bestseller at Inc.

References

2010 non-fiction books
American non-fiction books
Wiley (publisher) books